Pain Velayat Rural District is a rural district (dehestan) in Razaviyeh District, Mashhad County, Razavi Khorasan province, Iran. At the 2006 census, its population was 6,399, in 1,491 families.  The rural district has 26 villages.

References 

Rural Districts of Razavi Khorasan Province
Mashhad County